Colwell Massif is a rugged rock massif, about  long, rising to  between Palais Glacier, Ferrar Glacier, and Rotunda Glacier, in Victoria Land. It was named by the Advisory Committee on Antarctic Names in 1994 after Rita R. Colwell, marine microbiologist who has conducted field research in Antarctica; member of National Science Board (1983–90) who chaired Presidential committee on National Science Foundation roles in the polar regions; from 1991, President, Maryland Biotechnology Institute, University of Maryland.

See also 
Grootes Peak

References 

Mountains of Victoria Land
Scott Coast